The Masak Scimitar was an American mid-wing, single-seat glider that was designed and constructed by Peter Masak. It first flew in 1995.

The aircraft was destroyed and the designer killed in a soaring accident on 22 May 2004.

Design and development
The Scimitar was intended to use new aerodynamic technology to achieve higher performance in a competition sailplane. The aircraft mated a Schempp-Hirth Ventus fuselage with a wing of the same planform as the Schempp-Hirth Discus, outfitted with an electronic boundary layer control system.

The aircraft was made from carbon-fiber-reinforced polymer and fiberglass with Kevlar wing skins. Its  span wing initially employed a Wortmann FX 79-K-144 airfoil.

The sole example was registered with the US Federal Aviation Administration in the Experimental - Amateur-built category.

Operational history
The aircraft was involved in a minor accident on 25 April 1998 when trying to land after hitting sinking air while ridge soaring near Scrabble, West Virginia. While landing in a short  length field the pilot ground looped the aircraft to avoid hitting a tree.

The Scimitar was destroyed on 22 May 2004 while flying in the US Nationals near Alexandria, Pennsylvania. Masak was attempting to cross a ridge line and struck a tree, resulting in his death. The US National Transportation Safety Board determined the cause of the accident to be "The pilot's failure to maintain airspeed, which resulted in an inadvertent stall/spin. A factor was the turbulent wind conditions." A "nationally known, locally based glider instructor" who assisted the accident investigation stated that if Masak had successfully crossed the ridgeline, "he would have been the only pilot to do so, and probably would have easily won the day."

Variants
Scimitar I
Original configuration for the FAI 15-Metre Class, with a wing employing a Wortmann FX 79-K-144 airfoil
Scimitar II
Later configuration for the FAI Standard Class, with a wing employing a PM-24 airfoil

Specifications (Scimitar)

See also

References

1990s United States sailplanes
Homebuilt aircraft
Aircraft first flown in 1995